Noosa Heads Bus Station is serviced by Kinetic Group bus routes to Sunshine Plaza, Nambour station, Sunrise Beach, Sunshine Beach and Tewantin. It is near Hastings Street, Noosa Heads and is close to the Noosa Heads National Park. It is in Zone 8 of the Translink integrated public transport system.

Until August 2011, it was also served by long-distance services operated by Greyhound Australia and Premier Motor Service. However, these now call at Noosa Junction bus station.

Bus routes 
The following bus routes services Noosa Heads Bus Station:

References 

Bus stations in South East Queensland
Public transport in Sunshine Coast, Queensland